Lucio Fulci (17 June 1927 – 13 March 1996) was an Italian film director, screenwriter, and actor. Although he worked in a wide array of genres through a career spanning nearly five decades, including comedies and Spaghetti Westerns, he garnered an international cult following for his giallo and horror films.

His most notable films include the "Gates of Hell" trilogy—City of the Living Dead (1980), The Beyond (1981), and The House by the Cemetery (1981)—as well as Massacre Time (1966), One on Top of the Other (1969), Beatrice Cenci (1969), A Lizard in a Woman's Skin (1971), Don't Torture a Duckling (1972), White Fang (1973), Four of the Apocalypse (1975), Sette note in nero (1977), Zombi 2 (1979), Contraband (1980), The New York Ripper (1982), Murder Rock (1984), and A Cat in the Brain (1990). Although a number of films over the years were said to have been "co-produced" by Fulci, he was just allowing them to use his name to promote the films (with the exception of City of the Living Dead, which he did actively attempt to obtain some funding for).

Owing to his brand of expressive visuals and unconventional storytelling, Lucio Fulci has been called "The Poet of the Macabre" by genre critics and scholars, originally a reference to Edgar Allan Poe, whose work he freely adapted in The Black Cat (1981). The high level of graphic violence present in many of his films, especially Zombi 2, The Beyond, Contraband and The New York Ripper, has also earned him the nickname "The Godfather of Gore", which he shares with Herschell Gordon Lewis.

Life and career

The early years
Lucio Fulci was born in Trastevere, Rome, on 17 June 1927. His mother Lucia was from a poor but reputable Sicilian, politically anti-fascist family from Messina, Sicily. She had earlier eloped to Rome with a lover who later left her to raise their child (Lucio) alone. Lucio was raised Roman Catholic by his mother and a female housekeeper. He attended the Naval College in Venice, and near the end of World War II, completed his studies back in Rome at the Giulio Cesare State Classical School. He was interested in art, music, film, football, and had a love for sailing.

His mother encouraged him to be a lawyer, but he wound up going to medical school instead. After studying medicine for a time, he dropped out before completing his training, deciding there was more money to be made in the filmmaking industry He worked initially as an art critic, writing for Gazzetta delle Arti and Il Messaggero, and also joined the critical art group il Gruppo Arte Sociale.

His interest in the arts led him to apply to the film school in Rome named Centro Sperimentale where he apprenticed, after which he worked first as a director of documentaries, then an assistant director of motion pictures, then a screenwriter working mainly in the Italian comedy field in the early 1950s. The famed Italian director Steno took Fulci under his wing and allowed him to assist in the making of a number of comedies starring Totò. He also directed a number of comedies starring the actors Franco and Ciccio.

Fulci's giallo and horror films
Fulci moved into directing giallo thrillers with Una sull'altra (1969), A Lizard in a Woman's Skin (1971) and Sette note in nero (The Psychic, 1977), as well as Spaghetti Westerns such as Four of the Apocalypse (1975) and Silver Saddle (1978), all of which were commercially successful and controversial in their depictions of graphic violence.  Some of the special effects in A Lizard in a Woman's Skin involving mutilated dogs in a vivisection room were so realistic that Fulci was charged with animal cruelty; the charges were dropped when he produced the artificial canine puppets that were utilized in the film (created by special effects maestro Carlo Rambaldi).

His first film to gain significant notoriety in his native country, Don't Torture a Duckling (1972), combined scathing social commentary with the director's trademark graphic violence. Fulci had a Catholic upbringing and always referred to himself as a Catholic. Despite this, some of his movies (Beatrice Cenci, Don't Torture a Duckling, City of the Living Dead, etc.) have been viewed as having very anti-Catholic sentiment.

In 1979, he achieved his international breakthrough with Zombi 2, a violent zombie film that was marketed in European territories as a sequel to George Romero's Dawn of the Dead/Zombi (1978) without permission from Fulci nor Romero.

Several of Fulci's movies released in America were edited by the film distributor to ensure an R rating, such as The Beyond, which was originally released on video in severely edited form as Seven Doors of Death. Others were released Unrated in order to avoid an X-rating (as with Zombi 2 and House by the Cemetery) which would have restricted the films' target audiences to adults. The unrated films often played worldwide in drive-ins and grindhouses where they developed a cult following. Many of Fulci's horror films tend to contain "injury to the eye" sequences, in which a character's eyeball is either pierced or pulled out of its socket, usually in lingering, close-up detail.

Later career
Fulci travelled to the Philippines and spent six weeks shooting the film Zombi 3. Two opposing views were given for Fulci leaving the film, the first being an illness that left him unable to film and the second being that he was having disputes with producers. After completing filming, he would later state "(I) didn't finish making Zombie 3, but the reason wasn't anything to do with illness [...] there were arguments and so, I finished off an hour and a quarter of the film". Fulci stated that he couldn't get the script changed, which he deemed to be "dreadful", and modified it with his daughter. Claudio Fragasso stated that Fulci simplified his screenplay and shot a seventy-minute film which shocked producer Franco Gaudenzi.

By the second half of the 1980s, the Italian film industry was struggling with less theatrical distribution of films and productions being made to sell to foreign markets for television and home video. In some films, such as Gianni Martucci's The Red Monks, Fulci is credited as a "special effects supervisor" despite not showing up to set or preparing any special effects for the film. According to Martucci, Fulci "agreed to "present" the movie" as distributors required "a "heavy" name for the sales abroad. By then Fulci had become a name, let's say exportable. He was already very ill, and I met him to talk to him about the project" While Fulci's health did get better, Martucci stated that "at that time he couldn't even speak, devoured as he was by cirrhosis."

A series was developed titled I maestri del thriller was developed with the aim of television and home video markets, which was originally going to be a set of ten films but only eight were made. Fulci was invited by cinematographer Silvano Tessicini to the series as the director had just moved from Rome to Castelnuovo di Porto and was experiencing health problems after returning from the production of Zombi 3. Tessicini lived in the nearby Morlupo and on visiting him stated that Fulci "was not well, and had a huge belly", a consequence of the liver disease that affected Fulci during the filming of Zombi 3. Fulci was initially hired on the film as a supervisor but submitted the idea to director his own film, Touch of Death. When one of the directors walked away from the series, Fulci was invited to begin filming Sodoma's Ghost. It was filmed under the title Ghost Light and began shooting on 30 May 1988 with filming taking four weeks. Mario Bianchi was recruited by production supervisor Silvano Zignani to film some second unit scenes. According to Bianchi, "Fulci didn't leave the set he finished the film" while also stating "I wouldn't say I shot half the film, but almost" while Michele De Angelis stated that Bianchi was only on set for a couple of days. Three days after filming Sodoma's Ghost, Fulci began work on Touch of Death which began filming on 22 June 1988.  Another film in the series was Hansel e Gretel, which was originally set for Giovanni Simonelli to direct but after three weeks of filming only about 50 minutes of the film had been completed and large parts of the story were not filmed. Several weeks later Fulci was asked to supervise an additional week's shooting. According to the assistant director of the film Michele de Angelis,"Lucio shot everything. Simonelli stayed by his side, just watching...."  Along with Fulci, Andrea Bianchi was reportedly recruited to work on the film as well. Fulci was credited in another film in the series: as a supervisor in the film Bloody Psycho by Leandro Lucchetti. Fulci did not discuss the film with the director and did not show up at the set of the film. Fulci would later use the gory footage of the titles in the series used in his film A Cat in the Brain. Fulci added new scenes where he played himself, a horror director who visits a psychiatrist who he does not realize is a serial killer. The films in the I maestri del thriller series were later released on VHS and DVD as Lucio Fulci presenta by the Forumla Home Video label.

Fulci would also develop films for television as part of the series Le case maledette set up by producer Luciano Martino. The films were shot outside Rome with a schedule of four weeks each, with The House of Clocks filmed between 31 January and 25 February 1989. Immediately after finishing work on the film, Fulci started work on The Sweet House of Horrors which finished filming in March. The series was not shown in Italy and was released on VHS in 2000 and later shown on Italian satellite TV in 2006.

Fulci and Dario Argento
In the last decade of his life, Fulci suffered from emotional and physical health problems, reflected by a marked decline in the quality of his work. Fulci also continued to suffer during the late 1980s from recurring problems with diabetes and his liver. He hid the severity of his illness from his friends and associates so that he would not be deemed unemployable. His wife's suicide in 1969 had always weighed heavily on him (his wife Marina had killed herself with a gas oven after learning she had inoperable cancer). People who knew Fulci well spoke of a third daughter he once had who he said was killed in a car accident in the 1970s, but this story was never confirmed, and the daughter's name (if in fact she existed) was never revealed by any of his biographers. Fulci biographer Stephen Thrower wrote "....the suicide of his wife in 1969 was followed not long after by the death of a daughter in a road accident."  Dario Argento is quoted in one book as saying of Fulci "His life was terrible. His wife committed suicide, and his daughter was paralyzed because of an accident."

Fulci and Argento met in 1994 at the Rome Fanta Festival and surprisingly agreed to collaborate on a horror film called Wax Mask, a loose remake of the 1953 Vincent Price horror classic House of Wax. Argento claimed he had heard about Fulci's miserable circumstances at the time and wanted to offer him a chance at a comeback. It is said that Argento was shocked at how thin and sickly Fulci appeared at their 1994 meeting, and said he felt very sorry for him.

Fulci collaborated with writer Daniele Stroppa to create a screenplay for Argento, whose insistence on increasing the violence and gore quotient was, unusually, opposed by Fulci. (Stroppa had co-written two of Fulci's earlier films, The House of Clocks and Voices from Beyond). Fulci was slated to also direct the film, but he died before filming could begin, due to a series of delays caused by Argento's involvement with his own project, The Stendhal Syndrome, at the time. Wax Mask was eventually directed by former special effects artist Sergio Stivaletti. The screenplay was entirely reworked by Stivaletti after Fulci's death, so the finished film contains significant changes to Fulci's original screenplay. Argento also hired Fulci's daughter Antonella to serve as an assistant art director on the film.

Death and legacy 
Fulci died alone, in his sleep, in his apartment in Rome at around 2 pm on 13 March 1996 of a hyperglycemic diabetic coma, aged 68. Toward the end of his life, he had lost his house and was forced to move into a cramped apartment. Since Fulci had been so despondent in his later years, some believed that he may have intentionally allowed himself to die by not taking his glucose-controlling medication, but this is controversial. Dario Argento paid for Fulci's funeral arrangements. He was initially buried in Cimitero Flaminio, though his remains were later moved to Cimitero Laurentino.

Fulci's films had remained generally ignored or dismissed for many years by the mainstream critics, who regarded his work as exploitation. However, genre fans appreciated his films as being stylish exercises in extreme gore. At least one of his films, The Beyond, has "amassed a large and dedicated following". In 1998, The Beyond was re-released to theaters by Quentin Tarantino, who has often cited the film, and Fulci himself, as a major source of inspiration. Fulci's earlier, lesser-known giallo Don't Torture a Duckling (1972) received some critical acclaim as well. Fulci regarded two of his films, Don't Torture a Duckling and Beatrice Cenci, as his best all-around work, and considered both Zombi 2 and The Beyond as the two films that forever catapulted him to cult film stardom. His daughter Camilla served as an assistant director on his last five films (from 1989 to 1991) and has gone on to become an assistant director in the Italian film industry.

Fulci made an appearance at the January 1996 Fangoria horror convention in New York City, two months before his death. Walking on crutches with a bandaged foot, he told attendees that he had had no idea his films were so popular outside of his native Italy, as hordes of starstruck gore fans braved blizzard conditions that weekend to meet him.

Filmography 
Note: Films listed as "—" in the year column are not in chronological order

Television films
Note: Films listed as "—" in the year column are not in chronological order

Direct-to-video films
Note: Films listed as "—" in the year column are not in chronological order

Accolades

References

Sources

External links 
 

1927 births
1996 deaths
Italian film directors
Horror film directors
Male actors from Rome
Spaghetti Western directors
20th-century Italian screenwriters
Italian male screenwriters
Writers from Rome
Italian Roman Catholics
Deaths from diabetes
Giallo film directors
Italian communists
20th-century Italian male actors
20th-century Italian male writers